6 Canis Minoris is a star in the equatorial constellation of Canis Minor, located around 570 light years away from the Sun. It is visible to the naked eye as a faint, orange-hued star with an apparent visual magnitude of +4.55. This object is moving closer to the Earth with a heliocentric radial velocity of −16.3 km/s. Kinematically, it is a member of an outlying group belonging to the Ursa Major flow of the Sirius supercluster.

This is an evolved giant star with a stellar classification of K1 III. It has a mild barium anomaly, which may indicate this is a binary star system with a white dwarf companion. This star has four times the mass of the Sun and is radiating 761 times the Sun's luminosity from its enlarged photosphere at an effective temperature of 4,370 K.

References

K-type giants
Barium stars
Suspected variables
Canis Minor
BD+12 1567
Canis Minoris, 06
059294
036425
2864